William Hodson (24 January 1841 – 15 May 1896) was an English cricketer.  Hodson's batting and bowling styles are unknown.  He was born at Cocking, Sussex.

Hodson made his first-class debut for Sussex against Kent in 1860.  He made thirteen further first-class appearances for the county, the last of which came against the Marylebone Cricket Club in 1863.  In his fourteen first-class matches for Sussex, he scored 450 runs at an average of 20.45, with a high score of 50.  This score was his only half century and came against Kent in 1863.  He also made a single first-class appearance for the Gentlemen of the South against the Players of Surrey in 1863.

He died at Preston Park, Sussex on 15 May 1896.

References

External links
William Hodson at ESPNcricinfo
William Hodson at CricketArchive

1841 births
1896 deaths
People from Cocking, West Sussex
English cricketers
Sussex cricketers
Gentlemen of the South cricketers